The ACB Player of the Month Award is a basketball award that recognises the best Liga ACB player for each month of the season.

This award has been given out since the 1991–92 season, and it is not decided by the Performance Index Rating, despite being partly based on it.

Winners

Multiple winners
The below table lists those who have won on more than one occasion.

Awards won by nationality

Awards won by club

Footnotes

References

External links
ACB Official website 

Liga ACB awards